Trail to San Antone is a 1947 American Western film directed by John English, written by Jack Natteford and Luci Ford, and starring Gene Autry, Peggy Stewart, Sterling Holloway, William "Bill" Henry, Johnny Duncan and Tris Coffin. It was released on January 25, 1947, by Republic Pictures.

It was filmed in Lone Pine, California and at Deerwood Stock Farm in Thousand Oaks, California.

Plot
Gene is out to help a crippled jockey when a wild stallion runs away with the speedy mare he plans for the jockey to ride, so Gene takes off in an airplane to bring them back.

Cast 
Gene Autry as Gene Autry
Peggy Stewart as Kit Barlow
Sterling Holloway as Droopy Stearns
William "Bill" Henry as Rick Malloy
Johnny Duncan as Ted Malloy 
Tris Coffin as Cal Young
Dorothy Vaughan as The Commodore
Edward Keane as Sheriff Jones
Ralph Peters as Storekeeper Sam
The Cass County Boys as Singing Ranch Hands

References

External links 
 
Trail to San Antone trakt.tv

1947 films
Republic Pictures films
American Western (genre) films
1947 Western (genre) films
Films directed by John English
American black-and-white films
Films shot in Ventura County, California
1940s English-language films
1940s American films